British Forces Aden was the name given to the British Armed Forces stationed in the Aden Protectorate during part of the 20th century. Their purpose was to preserve the security of the Protectorate from both internal threats and external aggression.

History
British Forces Aden was originally formed as Aden Command in 1928. On its establishment, Aden Command was a Royal Air Force (RAF) command which was responsible for the control all British armed forces in the Protectorate.  It was renamed British Forces in Aden, or simply British Forces Aden, in 1936 and renamed again in 1956 as British Forces Arabian Peninsula.  In 1959 Middle East Command was divided into two commands split by the Suez Canal.  The two parts were British Forces Arabian Peninsular, which was based at Aden, and the remnants in Cyprus which on 1 March 1961 was renamed Near East Command.

On 1 March 1961 British Forces Arabian Peninsula was renamed, again, this time as Middle East Command (Aden). The senior commanders were Air Marshal Sir Charles Elworthy, C-in-C Middle East; Rear Admiral Talbot, Flag Officer, Middle East; Major General Jim Robertson, GOC Middle East Land Forces; Air Vice Marshal David Lee, Air Officer Commanding, Air Forces Middle East, and GOC East Africa Command. The GOC and AOC were working from the command HQ at Aden while FOME initially was at Bahrain with his headquarters at HMS Juffair. FOME moved to HMS Sheba in the naval dockyard at Steamer Point after the 1961 Kuwait crisis (Walker, Aden Insurgency, 90); Rear Admiral Talbot seemingly moved on May 1, 1962. Naval forces reportedly included three frigates, the Amphibious Warfare Squadron, the commando carrier , and 45 Commando Royal Marines based ashore at Aden. 45 Commando had arrived on 23 April 1960, disembarking from Dunera, and settling in BP Camp, which had been turned over by 1st Battalion, Royal Warwickshire Regiment.

At the end of November 1967, following the British withdrawal from Aden at the end of the Emergency, the remaining British Forces in the Arabian Peninsula, including units at Salalah and Masirah, were reorganized under Headquarters British Forces Gulf,  which was based at RAF Muharraq in Bahrain. British Forces Gulf was placed under the command of Rear Admiral John E. L. Martin, previously the last Flag Officer, Middle East, who handed over to Air Vice Marshal S B Grant on 4 April 1968. The command was disbanded on 15 December 1971.

Organization in 1939 
The structure of the units based in Aden in 1939:

Aden Colony 

 Headquarters
 Aden Squadron, Royal Corps of Signals
 Aden Protectorate Levies – 4 Battalions
 2/5th Battalion, Mahratta Light Infantry
 20th Fortress Company, Royal Engineers
 5th Heavy Regiment, Royal Artillery
 9th Field Battery, Royal Artillery
 15th Air Defence Battery, Hong Kong and Singapore Royal Artillery

Commanders
Commanders have included:

Aden Command
8 March 1928 Group Captain W G S Mitchell
5 September 1929 Group Captain C T MacLean (later Air Commodore)
7 August 1931 Group Captain O T Boyd
20 January 1934 Group Captain C F A Portal (Air Commodore from January 1935)
2 December 1935 Air Vice-Marshal E L Gossage

British Forces Aden
1 July 1936 Air Commodore W A McClaughry
28 September 1938 Air Vice-Marshal G R M Reid
10 September 1941 Air Vice-Marshal F G D Hards
12 January 1943 Air Vice-Marshal F H MacNamara (RAAF)
12 March 1945 Air Vice-Marshal H T Lydford
8 March 1948 Air Vice-Marshal A C Stevens
1 March 1950 Air Vice-Marshal F J Fressanges
11 March 1952 Air Vice-Marshal D Macfadyen
12 October 1953 Air Vice-Marshal S O Bufton
17 September 1955 Air Vice-Marshal L F Sinclair

British Forces Arabian Peninsula
30 September 1957 Air Vice-Marshal M L Heath
19 September 1959 Air Chief Marshal Sir Hubert Patch
3 August 1960 Air Marshal Sir Charles Elworthy

Commanders (Air Forces)

Air Forces Middle East
 1959 Air Chief Marshal DJ Pryer Lee
 1961 Air Chief Marshal F Rosier
 1963 Air commodore J E Johnson
 15 December 1965 Air Vice-Marshal AH Humphrey

See also
 RAF Khormaksar
 List of British Army installations
 List of Royal Air Force commands

References

Bibliography

Royal Air Force commands
Joint commands of the United Kingdom
20th-century establishments in the Aden Protectorate
1928 establishments in Asia
1928 establishments in the British Empire
Military units and formations established in 1928
Aden in World War II
Military units and formations in Aden in World War II
Military history of Aden during World War II
Military units and formations established in 1961